A workshop production is a form of theatrical performance, in which a play or musical is staged in a modest form which does not include some aspects of a full production. For example, costumes, sets and musical accompaniment may be excluded, or may be included in a simpler form.  In contrast, tryout productions are usually presented as full productions, with performers in costume, on a set, and accompanied by an orchestra or band.

One common purpose of a workshop production is to provide a preview staging of a new work in order to gauge audience and critical reaction, following which some parts of the work may be adjusted or rewritten before the work's official premiere. Because a workshop production generally pays less for the rights to perform the play, workshop productions also provide an opportunity for smaller theatres to generate increased publicity by staging a popular or highly anticipated work for which a full production might be too costly. Some theatre companies, in fact, specialize exclusively in workshop productions; amateur and youth theatre companies, for example, are commonly structured on the workshop production model.

When hearing about workshop productions and contrasting them with Off-Broadway or Broadway versions of these plays differences can vary between cut alternate scenes or in musical cases cut songs or alternate lyrics. Typically workshop productions take place in college theaters or venues that are considered as Off-Broadway theaters. 

Some fictional works, including the musical A Chorus Line and the television series Smash, depict the audition and workshop processes of developmental theatrical productions.

See also
Read-through

Theatre